Namosi District is one of the districts of Namosi Province, Fiji. The province is ruled by a council and chaired by Ratu Kiniviliame Taukeinikoro.

Districts of Namosi Province